The 2007–08 season saw Glasgow Warriors compete in the Celtic League and the Heineken Cup.

Team

Coaches

Staff

Chairman: Charles Shaw
Chief Executive: Ian Riddoch
Medical Team: Dr. Gerry Haggerty, Lisa Casey, Paul McGinley, Nicola McGuire
Fitness Team: Gary Sheriff, Andy Smith, Ian Cleland
Media Manager: Stuart Martin
Kit Manager & Masseur: Dougie Mills
Video Analyst: Robert Holdsworth
Team Co-Ordinator: Kim Gray
Community Board Members: Walter Malcolm, Douglas McCrea
Community Marketing Officer: Natalie Duncan
Administrator: Nicola Sturgeon

Squad

Academy players

  Alan Dymock – Prop
  Neil Rodger – Hooker
  Pat MacArthur – Hooker
  Richie Gray – Lock
  Rob Harley – Flanker
  Calum Forrester – Flanker

  Andy Dymock – Scrum half
  Jamie Hunter – Fly-half
  Andy White – Fly-half
  Steven Aitken – Centre
  Scott Forrest – Centre
  Richard Mills
  Ben Addison – Full back

Player statistics

During the 2007–08 season, Glasgow used 35 different players in competitive games. The table below shows the number of appearances and points scored by each player.

Staff movements

Staff

Personnel in

  Ian Riddoch – General Manager

Player movements

Academy promotions

  Moray Low

Player transfers

In

  Ross Ford from  Border Reivers
  Lome Fa'atau from  Hurricanes
  Bernardo Stortoni from  Bristol
  Chris O'Young from  Western Force
  Richie Vernon from  Border Reivers
  Daryl Gibson from  Leicester Tigers
  Dougie Hall from  Edinburgh
  Ed Kalman from  Border Reivers

Out

  Stuart Corsar to  Rotherham Titans
  Ross Ford to  Edinburgh Rugby
  Francisco Leonelli released
  Scott Lawson to  Sale Sharks
  Euan Murray to  Northampton Saints
  Rory Lamont to  Sale Sharks
  Jon Petrie retired

Competitions

Pre-season and friendlies

Match 1

Rotherham Titans: 
Replacements: 

Glasgow Warriors: Sean Marsden, Hefin O"Hare, Graeme Morrison, Scott Barrow, Colin Shaw, Colin Gregor, Sam Pinder, Michael Collins, Eric Milligan, Ben Prescott, James Eddie, Opeta Palepoi, Stevie Swindall, Donnie Macfadyen, Johnnie Beattie
Replacements: Ben Addison, Daryl Gibson, Thom Evans, Mike Adamson, Chris O"Young, Pat McArthur, Ed Kalman, Andy Newman, Dan Turner, Richie Vernon, John Barclay, Scott Forrest, Ruaridh Jackson, Jamie Hunter

Match 2

Glasgow Warriors: Michael Collins, Eric Milligan, Ben Prescott, Andy Newman, Alastair Kellock, Steve Swindall, Donnie Macfadyen, Johnnie Beattie, Chris O'Young, Colin Gregor, Hefin O'Hare, Daryl Gibson, Graeme Morrison, Max Evans, Colin Shaw
Replacements: Pat MacArthur, Ed Kalman, Moray Low, Dan Turner, James Eddie, Opeta Palepoi, Richie Vernon, Scott Forrest, Sam Pinder, Mike Adamson, Sean Marsden, Scott Barrow, Bernardo Stortoni

Newcastle Falcons: Matt Burke, Tom May, James Hoyle, Mark Mayerhofler, John Rudd, Steve Jones, Lee Dickson, Joe McDonnell, Matt Thompson, Micky Ward, Andy Buist, Mark Sorenson, Geoff Parting, Ben Woods, Phil Dowson (c)
Replacements: Andy Long, David Wilson, Jon Golding, Andy Perry, Brent Wilson, James Grindal, Adam Dehaty, Joe Shaw, Ollie Phillips

Match 3

Wasps: 
Replacements: 

Glasgow Warriors: Michael Collins, Eric Milligan, Moray Low, Andy Newman, Dan Turner, Steve Swindall, Donnie Macfadyen, Johnnie Beattie, Chris O'Young, Colin Gregor, Thom Evans, Scott Barrow, Graeme Morrison, Hefin O'Hare, Colin Shaw
Replacements: Pat MacArthur, Ed Kalman, Ben Prescott, James Eddie, Opeta Palepoi, Richie Vernon, Sam Pinder, Mike Adamson, Max Evans, Sean Marsden, Scott Barrow, Bernardo Stortoni

Match 4

Leeds Carnegie: 1 Michael Cusack 2 Scott Freer 3 Adam Hopcroft 4 James Craig 5 Mark Anderson 6 Andrew Boyde 7 Sam Stitcher ( C ) 8 Max Lewis 9 Mike Aspinall 10 Adam Greendale 11 Luther Burrell 12 Lee Blackett 13 Tom Rock 14 Andy Rock 15 Pete Wackett

Replacements: 16 Chris Steel 17 Aarin Yorke 18 Chris Wilson 19 Gareth Williams 20 Dan White 21 Luke Gray

Glasgow Warriors: 15 Colin Shaw 14 Hefin O"Hare 13 Graeme Morrison 12 Scott Barrow 11 Chris Kinloch 10 Colin Gregor 9 Mike Adamson 1 Justin Va'a 2 Eric Milligan 3 Mike Collins 4 Opeta Palepoi 5 Dan Turner 6 James Eddie 7 Calum Forrester 8 Richie Vernon
Replacements: Ruaridh Jackson, Andrew Dymock, Scott Forrest, Allan Kelly, Ben Prescott, Pat McArthur, Alan Dymock, Tom Bury

European Champions Cup

Pool 4

Results

Round 1

Round 2

Round 3

Round 4

Round 5

Round 6

Magners Celtic League

League table

Results

Some of the all Welsh fixtures were played early to allow the Welsh teams to play in the British & Irish Cup.

Round 1

Round 2

Round 3

Round 4

Round 5

Round 6

Round 7

Round 8

Round 9: 1872 Cup (1st Leg)

Round 10

Round 11

Round 12

Round 13

Round 14

Round 15: 1872 Cup (2nd Leg)

Glasgow Warriors won the 1872 Cup with an aggregate score of 54–49.

Round 16

Round 17

Round 18

References

2007-08
2007–08 in Scottish rugby union
2007–08 Celtic League by team
2007–08 Heineken Cup by team